Universe People or Cosmic People of Light Powers  is a Czech and Slovak UFO religion founded in the 1990s and centered on Ivo A. Benda. Their belief system is based upon the existence of extraterrestrial civilizations communicating with Benda and other contactees since October 1997 telepathically and later even by direct personal contact. They are considered to be the most distinctive UFO religion in the Czech Republic.

Following the mass suicide of the members of the cult Heaven's Gate in 1997, the Universe People attracted the attention of Czech media as a group with similar ideology and potential to commit similar acts. The probability of this development has diminished in later years (2004). On several occasions, the group also managed to appear in the Czech and Slovak mass media.

History 

Ivo A. Benda began his public activities in the middle of the 1990s. He has organized more than 180 lectures, visited by more than 12,000 people (according to his own words). In 1997 he published the book Rozhovory s poučením od mých přátel z vesmíru (Interviews With Instructions From My Friends From the Universe). At the beginning of the 2000s he managed to penetrate the mass media, he appeared in the Nova TV and in the Czech Television (Czech state broadcasting channel). Some of the visitors of his public lectures considered his speeches as a perfect mystification or joke, however, psychiatrists labelled his performances as a bizarre psychotic delusion. From 1998 to 2000, the ideology of the Universe People was close to sectarianism, with a central idea of coming cosmic catastrophe and evacuation of people to another planet. However, their later efforts moved to defence against the attacks of negative extraterrestrial beings, called saurians  or lizard people (in Czech: ještírci).

In the second half of the 2000s, Ivo Benda and his group became more publicly known also in Slovakia. In 2007, the Slovak private television channel TV JOJ reported that the Universe People sent instructions on how to defend against attacks of evil extraterrestrial entities to the Slovak Ministry of Defense. The envelopes also contained suspicious material, which alarmed the Slovak Military Police and security services. One of the buildings of the Ministry was evacuated. These envelopes contained instructional CDs and promotional materials of the group. Ivo Benda stated on TV: "If you were attacked by a lizard man from an outer world, the Ministry of Defense should defend the people, shouldn't it? Or do you consider those lizard people as friends?" The suspicion of a security threat was unproven.

Ideology 
According to Benda, extraterrestrial civilizations operate a fleet of spaceships, led by Ashtar Galactic Command, orbiting the Earth. They closely watch and help the good and are waiting to transport their followers into another dimension. The Universe People's teachings incorporate various elements from ufology (some foreign contactees are credited, though often also renounced after a time as misguided or deceptive), Christianity (Jesus was a "fine-vibrations" being) and conspiracy theories (forces of evil are supposed to plan compulsory chipping of the population).

Benda based his philosophy on information from many independent books, including Angels In Starships (Giorgio Dibitonto), Inside The Spaceships (George Adamski), Bringers Of The Dawn (Barbara Marciniak) and others. He also adopted parts of Swiss citizen Billy Meier's philosophy. However, Benda's philosophy is in some points in conflict with Meier's and Meier has declined any contacts with Benda and does not recognize his movement.

Members of the movement distrust modern technologies and control mechanisms of the society. They consider mass media to be a tool of oppression and manipulation. Despite this, Benda often seeks contact with journalists to tell his ideas to the public. They often have problems with copyright infringement, because Benda has declared that the only copyright owners are the Universe creatures, who do not consider it important. The movement also wants to abolish money.

Opponents and cultural impact
Opponents consider Benda and some more active of his followers to be mentally ill and the Universe People to be a potentially dangerous cult. According to Zdeněk Vojtíšek (from the anticult Society for Studying of Sects and New Religious Movements), the movement represents a possible danger because of its religious background and similar features with Christianity.

In 2000, Benda announced the organization of the 1st World Symposium of Love, held at the Prague Castle under the auspices of the President Václav Havel. Havel's office denied his claims. Benda later stated that three months before the Symposium Havel had said that he would attend, but later changed his mind.

The group's enthusiastic propaganda on the Internet (a large website in garish colours) including spam, the nature of their recorded "messages" as well as attempts to comment on every aspect of life and appropriate any popular notion (life in The Matrix, for example) has built it an Internet cult following who make fun of it and even visit Benda's frequent rambling public lectures.

Notes

References

Further reading

External links
Universe People website
 Aštar Šeran (Reflex 2003)
 Řídí Daniela Landu mimozemšťané? (Reflex 2005)
 Ještírci napadli web Vesmírných lidí (Novinky.cz 2003)
 Ufokult Vesmírní lidé v bratislavskej MHD (Dnes.sk, 2008)
 Dosáhněte zasvěcení prostřednictvím internetu (tutorial) - Technet.cz (iDnes)
 Ivo A. Benda live on Czech TV (video)
 Ivo A. Benda live on Slovak TV (video)

Czech culture
UFO religions